The Hong Kong Maritime and Port Board (HKMPB) is a Hong Kong Government body, with responsibility to:
 assist the government in devising maritime and port-related strategies and initiatives;
 facilitate collaboration between stakeholders, and work closely with the Government;
 create a maritime business-friendly environment;
 foster the long-term development of Hong Kong's maritime industry and port; and
 support and promote Hong Kong's maritime community.

The board was established on 1 April 2016, by the merging of the former Hong Kong Maritime Industry Council and Hong Kong Port Development Council, in a move welcomed by the maritime industry as signalling more support for them.

Under the HKMPB are three committees: the Maritime and Port Development Committee; the Promotion and External Relations Committee; and the Manpower Development Committee.

Membership

There are 19 non-official, eight institutional and three ex-officio members of the Board, which is chaired by the Secretary for Transport and Housing.

Membership at foundation, April 2016

 Mr Paul Chan Kei-yan
 Ms Agnes Choi Heung-kwan
 Mr Patrick Fong Yiu-fai
 Mr Michael Goh Pek-yang
 Mr Sean Aloysius Kelly

 Mr Kwok Kwok-chuen
 Miss Rosita Lau Sui-yee
 Mr Li Lian-jun
 Dr Venus Lun Yuen-ha
 Ms Iris Mak Kam-yu

 Dr Jimmy Ng Jim-mi
 Mr John Bruce Rae-Smith
 Mr Xiong Ge-bing
 Miss Elsa Yeung Mei-fong
 Mr Frankie Yick Chi-ming
 Mr Gerry Yim Lui-fai

External links
 Official page

References

2016 establishments in Hong Kong
Hong Kong government departments and agencies